Martin Hugh Michael O'Neill,  (born 1 March 1952) is a Northern Irish professional football manager and former player who played as a midfielder. After a brief early career in the Irish League, O'Neill moved to England where he spent most of his playing career with Nottingham Forest. He won the First Division title in 1977–78 and the European Cup twice, in 1979 and 1980. He was capped 64 times for the Northern Ireland national football team, also captaining the side at the 1982 World Cup.

O'Neill has managed Grantham Town, Wycombe Wanderers, Norwich City, Leicester City, Celtic, Aston Villa and Sunderland. He guided Leicester City to the Football League Cup final three times, winning twice. As Celtic manager between 2000 and 2005, he led that club to seven trophies including three Scottish Premier League titles and the 2003 UEFA Cup Final. After joining Aston Villa he achieved three consecutive sixth-place finishes in the English Premier League and guided them to the 2010 Football League Cup Final.

He became Republic of Ireland manager in 2013 and led them to qualification for the 2016 UEFA European Championship for the third time in the nation's history, beating the reigning world champions, Germany in the process. He left the role with assistant Roy Keane by "mutual agreement" in November 2018. He was appointed as Nottingham Forest manager in January 2019 but left six months later.

Early life and Gaelic football career
O'Neill was born in Kilrea, County Londonderry, Northern Ireland, in 1952. He was the sixth child of nine siblings, and has four brothers and four sisters. O'Neill's father was a founding member of local GAA club Pádraig Pearse's Kilrea. His brothers Gerry and Leo played for the club as well as being on the Derry senior team which won the 1958 Ulster Championship and reached that year's All-Ireland Championship final. He played for both Kilrea and Derry at underage level as well. He also played Gaelic football while boarding at St. Columb's College, Derry, and later at St. Malachy's College, Belfast.

While at St. Malachy's, he first came to public attention as a football player with local side Rosario and then eventually with Distillery. This breached the Gaelic Athletic Association prohibition on Gaelic footballers playing "foreign sports". When St. Malachy's reached the 1970 MacRory Cup final, the Antrim GAA County Board refused to allow the game to go ahead at Belfast's Casement Park. The colleges involved switched the venue to County Tyrone to enable him to play. St. Malachy's won the game.

Club career

Early career
Before playing for Distillery in the Irish League, O'Neill played for the South Belfast side Rosario. (Now he also has a conference room dedicated to him in Rosario Football Club's local Youth Club.) While at Distillery, he won the Irish Cup in 1971, scoring twice in a 3–0 win over Derry City in the final. His second goal was particularly impressive, a mazy run in which he dribbled past three opponents before scoring with a powerful shot. As a result of winning the cup, Distillery qualified for Europe the following season. O'Neill scored against Barcelona in the European Cup Winners' Cup in a 3–1 home defeat in September 1971. During this period he was spotted by a scout for Nottingham Forest. He signed for Nottingham Forest in October 1971, leaving Distillery and quitting his university studies.

Nottingham Forest

O'Neill went on to play an integral role in Forest's golden era. He scored on his league debut for the club, a 4–1 win over West Bromwich Albion on 13 November 1971. He went on to make a total of 17 league appearances that season, scoring twice, but could not prevent his side's relegation from the First Division in 1972. However, the appointment of Brian Clough as manager in January 1975 was the beginning of a revolution for Nottingham Forest. Under Clough's management, O'Neill helped Forest gain promotion to the top flight in 1977, won the league title and League Cup a year later, followed by further League Cup success a year later. He was dropped to the substitutes bench for Forest's first European Cup victory over Malmö in 1979 after failing to fully recover from an injury, but he played in their 1980 win over Hamburg.

Later career
O'Neill signed for Norwich City in February 1981 for £250,000, however, Norwich were relegated on the last day of the season and he activated a release clause which enabled him to sign for Manchester City. Despite a good start, he soon became out of favour with manager John Bond and returned to Norwich in February 1982, where he scored six goals to help them finish third and secure promotion. After another season at Norwich, he returned to Nottingham to play for Notts County where they had successive relegations. O'Neill attempted to make a comeback in 1984 with Chesterfield, but only played part of a reserve game before being forced off with a knee injury after 20 minutes. This was made in an attempt to get fit for Northern Ireland's 1986 World Cup squad. After leaving Chesterfield, then-Fulham manager Ray Harford invited O'Neill to join the club in a bid to regain his fitness. O'Neill only managed to take part in two reserve games for Fulham (neither of which he completed), before retiring as a result of his cruciate ligament injury in February 1985.

International career
O'Neill first represented his country in an amateur international against Scotland at The Oval in February 1971. Then he made his senior debut in a UEFA Euro 1972 qualifying game against Soviet Union national football team on 13 October 1971. He was then a regular for Northern Ireland, captaining the side at the 1982 World Cup in Spain which reached the second group stage and included defeating the host nation in Valencia. He played 64 times and scored eight goals for Northern Ireland between 1971 and 1984. He also won the British Home Championship twice as a player, in 1980 and 1984.

Managerial career
After his playing career, O'Neill worked at an insurance company before beginning a career in football management, initially at Grantham Town in 1987. This was followed by a brief spell at the helm of Shepshed Charterhouse.

Wycombe Wanderers
He became manager of Wycombe Wanderers in February 1990. He played in the Martin O'Neill XI side, along with George Best, in the last match to be played at Loakes Park. In the 1990–91 season, he took Wycombe to fifth in the Football Conference. In the 1991–92 season, he led Wycombe to 2nd place in the Conference, losing out to Colchester United only on goal difference. The following season, he took Wycombe into the Football League for the very first time. In the 1993–94 season, he took Wycombe to a second successive promotion via the Division 3 play-offs and a 4–2 win over Preston North End took them up into Division 2. In the 1994–95 season, Wycombe narrowly missed out on the Division 2 play-offs and he left the club on 13 June 1995 to become manager at Norwich City. O'Neill also won the FA Trophy with Wycombe in 1991 and 1993.

Under O'Neill, Wycombe also reached the Conference League Cup final twice (winners in 1991–92). The team also won three Conference Shield titles and the (Evening Standard) London Fives in 1994 and 1995. Wycombe were also beaten finalists in both the Berks & Bucks Senior Cup and Drinkwise Cup.

As of June 2019, he remains as Wycombe's most successful manager in their history.

Norwich City
O'Neill became manager of Norwich City in June 1995, and left the club in December, due to differences with club chairman Robert Chase over the potential signing of striker Dean Windass, during his first stint at Hull City for £750,000.

Leicester City
O'Neill joined Leicester City, immediately after leaving Norwich City. In his first season, Leicester were promoted from the Football League to the Premier League via the play-offs. They won the Football League Cup under him in 1997, and 2000, as well as reaching the 1999 final of the competition. They finished ninth in the Premier League in 1997, tenth in 1998 and 1999, and eighth in 2000. The two League Cup triumphs saw them qualify for the UEFA Cup in 1997–98 and 2000–01.

In October 1998, he was favourite to take over the manager's job at Leeds United. George Graham, who had just resigned from Leeds, brought his Spurs team to Filbert Street for his first game in charge. Leicester Mercury organised a protest and printed thousands of "Don't Go Martin" posters, which were held up by fans throughout the game, which Leicester won. Thousands of balloons were also released. O'Neill remained as Leicester manager until his contract expired.

Celtic
O'Neill left Leicester on 1 June 2000, taking over from the team of John Barnes and Kenny Dalglish to become manager of Celtic, who had finished runners-up to Old Firm rivals Rangers in both of their previous seasons; in the season just gone, they had finished 21 points behind the champions.

O'Neill's first Old Firm game, in late August 2000, ended in a 6–2 victory for Celtic over Rangers. It was their biggest victory over Rangers since the 1957 Scottish League Cup Final. His second Old Firm game saw a reversal of fortunes, however, as Celtic suffered a 5–1 defeat. In that first season, O'Neill won a domestic treble with Celtic, the first time this had been achieved since 1968–69. He was then touted as a potential successor to Alex Ferguson, who had announced he was to leave Manchester United in 2002. Celtic then retained the league title in 2001–02, the first time since 1982 that Celtic had managed that feat. Celtic also qualified for the Champions League group stage, winning all of their home games but losing all of their away games.

He then guided Celtic to the 2003 UEFA Cup Final in Seville, which Celtic lost 3–2 in extra time to a Porto side managed by José Mourinho. This was Celtic's first European final since 1970 and they beat Blackburn, Celta Vigo, Stuttgart, Liverpool and Boavista on the way to the final. The following season Celtic regained the league title from rivals Rangers and reached the quarter finals of the UEFA Cup, including a victory against Barcelona.

On 25 May 2005, Celtic announced that O'Neill would resign as manager to care for his wife Geraldine, who had lymphoma. His last competitive game in charge of Celtic was the Scottish Cup final 1–0 victory over Dundee United on 28 May 2005, decided by an eleventh-minute goal by Alan Thompson.

Under O'Neill, Celtic won 213, drew 29 and lost 40, of 282 games played, and he was the most successful Celtic manager since Jock Stein. In his five seasons at Celtic Park, O'Neill won three League titles, three Scottish Cups, and a League Cup. The two league titles he lost were by margins of a point and a goal. He also oversaw a record 7 consecutive victories in Old Firm derbies, and in season 2003–04 Celtic created a British record of 25 consecutive league victories. His win rate of 75.5% is the highest of any manager in the club's history.

Aston Villa

O'Neill was introduced as the Aston Villa manager at a press conference on 4 August 2006. At the press conference he stated "It's absolutely fantastic to be back and with a club such as this. This is a fantastic challenge. I am well aware of the history of this football club. Trying to restore it to its days of former glory seems a long way away – but why not try? It is nearly 25 years since they won the European Cup but that is the dream."

Villa had the year's longest unbeaten start of any Premier League side in 2006–07 (9 games), not losing a league game until 28 October. Villa suffered a mid-season slump but recovered late in the season, winning their three away games in April, to end the season how it began with a run of 9 unbeaten fixtures. For this O'Neill was named the Premier League Manager of the Month for April. Villa's final points tally was 50, an improvement of 8 over the previous season and finished 11th, 5 places higher than the previous season. In October 2007, Aston Villa owner Randy Lerner said that he would not stop O'Neill from leaving Villa if he was offered the vacant post of England manager. O'Neill later dismissed the reports, calling them "unfair speculation".

Aston Villa just missed out on a UEFA Cup spot on the final day of the 2007–08 season and qualified for the Intertoto Cup by finishing 6th. They scored 71 goals, (their best ever tally in the Premier League and best tally since winning the title in 1981), gained 60 points which was Villa's highest points tally since 1996–97, and were the third highest goalscorers.

After 25 games of the 2008–09 season, having qualified for the UEFA Cup as joint winners of the Intertoto Cup, the club were third in the table on 51 points, 2 points above Chelsea on level games and 7 points above Arsenal in 5th place and on course for a place in the Champions League for the first time since 1983. O'Neill decided to prioritise Champions League qualification above all else, fielding a virtual reserve side for a UEFA Cup game against CSKA Moscow which was subsequently lost. Following this, Villa failed to win any of the next 8 league games and improving form for Arsenal & Chelsea meant that Villa failed to reach the top 4.

At the start of the 2009–10 season Villa failed to qualify for the group stage of the newly named Europa League, but continued their progress in the league with wins against Manchester United, Chelsea and Liverpool. Arsenal defeated Villa 3–0 at Emirates Stadium, and drew at home.

Once again Villa finished 6th for the 3rd season running, and once again improved their points tally finishing with 64 points; their poor home form (they drew 8 times at home) denied them a chance to qualify for the UEFA Champions League.

Aston Villa reached their first final under Martin O'Neill, and first final in 10 years on 28 February 2010 against Manchester United in the League Cup, but lost 2–1.

On 9 August 2010, O'Neill resigned as manager of Aston Villa with immediate effect.
On his departure O'Neill said "I have enjoyed my time at Aston Villa immensely. It's obviously a wrench to be leaving such a magnificent club." O'Neill was reportedly unhappy about the funds available for transfers, but his departure just five days before the start of the new season still came as a shock to the club and its players. Lerner issued a statement two days later saying he and O'Neill "no longer shared a common view as to how to move forward, but the two remain good friends."

Sunderland
On 3 December 2011, O'Neill signed a three-year contract with the Premier League club Sunderland, the team he had supported as a boy. In O'Neill's first game in charge Sunderland came from 1–0 down to beat Blackburn Rovers 2–1 at the Stadium of Light. Under O'Neill, Sunderland began to improve dramatically with four wins from his first six games, including one over league leaders Manchester City. The Daily Telegraph commented that Sunderland could make a late challenge for a European place if they kept their performances up. Sunderland continued to perform well in the first few months under O'Neill. They rose to ninth in the league and continued their challenge for a Europa League spot. On 18 February, they beat Arsenal 2–0 to knock them out of the FA Cup fifth round. A week after this they lost 4–0 to West Bromwich Albion. The next week was O'Neill's first Tyne–Wear derby. The 'fiercely contested' match finished 1–1 with two red cards for Sunderland. The following week Sunderland defeated Liverpool 1–0 at the Stadium Of Light. Sunderland's form petered out at the end of the season and after no wins in the last 8 games but they finished a respectable 13th place, a position Sunderland fans would've been happy with after the start to the season.

The following season, O'Neill had bought Steven Fletcher and Adam Johnson in an attempt to build on his previous 13th place and push on for the top 10. He claimed a solid 0–0 draw at the Emirates against Arsenal in the first game of the season. Sunderland went unbeaten for the first five games before a 3–0 defeat at Manchester City. They then claimed a 1–1 draw in O'Neill's first Tyne-Wear derby at the Stadium of Light thanks to a late Demba Ba own goal. Sunderland then suffered a surprising 0–1 home defeat to Aston Villa and a 1–0 defeat to Middlesbrough in the League Cup. After a 2–4 home defeat to West Brom, rumours circulated that O'Neill had resigned. These were all quashed quickly and O'Neill continued despite slipping into the relegation zone following a 1–3 home defeat to Chelsea. Sunderland's form started to improve over the winter as they climbed the table following an impressive run of results including another 1–0 success over Manchester City and a 2–3 success over Wigan as they reached a season high of 11th. However, this proved to be O'Neill's last victory as Sunderland endured a run of 8 games without a win.

Martin O'Neill was sacked by Sunderland on 30 March 2013 following a 1–0 defeat by Manchester United which left the team one point above the Premier League relegation zone with seven games left to play in the season. Sunderland had failed to secure victory in the eight matches leading up to O'Neill's departure, winning only three points out of a possible 24 during that spell.

Republic of Ireland
O'Neill was confirmed as the new Republic of Ireland national football team manager on 5 November 2013. He was joined by former team captain Roy Keane as his assistant manager.
His first game in charge on 15 November 2013 against Latvia was a 3–0 win at the Aviva Stadium. On 19 November 2013, O'Neill's first away game as manager saw the team draw 0–0 against Poland at the Stadion Miejski in Poznań.
His first loss as manager came on 5 March 2014, a 2–1 home friendly defeat to Serbia.

On 16 November 2015, the Republic of Ireland qualified for UEFA Euro 2016 after defeating Bosnia and Herzegovina 3–1 on aggregate in the play-offs.

O'Neill courted controversy in March 2016 following comments he made about the physical appearance of players' female partners, which were condemned as sexist. According to Orla O'Connor of the National Women's Council of Ireland: "There is no place for sexist comments of this nature in Irish football, particularly at this level" 

On 7 June 2016, O'Neill signed a contract extensions until the 2018 FIFA World Cup in Russia. On 22 June 2016, Ireland defeated Italy 1–0 in their final group game of Euro 2016 to qualify for the knock-out stages and round of 16 match against France.

In June 2016, O'Neill was criticised for using a derogatory term to describe LGBT people. During a public appearance in Cork that month, O'Neill informed a gathering of Ireland football fans that he had two others accompany assistant Roy Keane and him on a recent visit to San Francisco as he was worried people might think they were "queers". The Gay and Lesbian Equality Network (GLEN) condemned the comments and called on him to apologise to the LGBT community. The National LGBT Federation also called on O'Neill to withdraw the remarks and apologise, noting that O'Neill's behaviour could only have a detrimental effect on attempts to tackle homophobic prejudice in sport. He apologised for the derogatory remark a number of days later.

On 9 October 2017, Ireland defeated Wales 1–0 in Cardiff to qualify for the qualification play-offs. In the first leg of the play-offs on 11 November, Ireland drew 0–0 against Denmark in Copenhagen. In the second leg on 14 November in Dublin, Ireland lost 5–1 to Denmark after taking the lead in the game. In January 2018, O'Neill signed a new two-year contract with the FAI after previously verbally agreeing to the contract in October 2017.

On 6 September 2018, an understrength Ireland lost 4–1 to Wales in their opening game in the UEFA Nations League. Ireland went on to finish bottom of their group, picking up just two points in two 0–0 draws against Denmark and were relegated to UEFA Nations League C for the 2020–21 UEFA Nations League (although were later restored to League B following a format change).  On 21 November 2018, O'Neill parted company with the FAI.

Nottingham Forest
It was announced on 15 January 2019 that O'Neill had become the manager of Nottingham Forest. O'Neill guided the club to a ninth-place finish in the Championship. However, he was sacked as manager on 28 June 2019, soon after assistant Roy Keane had departed the club.

Outside football
Despite never completing his degree, O'Neill remains a follower of criminology. His fascination began with the James Hanratty case of 1961.
He has worked in television as an analyst for BBC and ITV at the World Cup, the European Championship and on UEFA Champions League matches.

O'Neill was appointed a Member of the Order of the British Empire (MBE) in the 1983 New Year Honours for services to association football, and promoted to Officer of the same Order (OBE) for services to football in the 2004 New Year Honours. In 2002, Norwich supporters voted him into the club's Hall of Fame.

He was awarded the Nottingham Lifetime Achievement Award on 3 November 2013 for his services to football and achievements with Nottingham Forest.

Personal life
O'Neill and his wife Geraldine have two daughters.

In his youth, O'Neill supported Sunderland A.F.C. and Celtic F.C.. His favourite player was Sunderland's captain and centre half Charlie Hurley, who eventually won Sunderland's Man of the Century award in 1979.

Career statistics

International goals

Scores and results list Northern Ireland's goal tally first.

Managerial statistics

Honours

Player
Distillery
Irish Cup: 1970–71

Nottingham Forest
First Division: 1977–78
League Cup: 1977–78, 1978–79
European Cup: 1978–79, 1979–80
FA Charity Shield: 1978
European Super Cup: 1979
Anglo-Scottish Cup: 1976–77

Northern Ireland
British Home Championship: 1979–80, 1983–84

Manager
Wycombe Wanderers
Football League Third Division play-offs: 1994
Football Conference: 1992–93
FA Trophy: 1990–91, 1992–93
Conference League Cup: 1991–92
Football Conference Shield: 1991–92, 1992–93, 1993–94

Leicester City
Football League First Division play-offs: 1996
Football League Cup: 1996–97, 1999–2000

Celtic
Scottish Premier League: 2000–01, 2001–02, 2003–04
Scottish Cup: 2000–01, 2003–04, 2004–05
Scottish League Cup: 2000–01
UEFA Cup runner-up: 2002–03

Aston Villa
Football League Cup runner-up: 2009–10

Individual
Premier League Manager of the Month: September 1997, October 1998, November 1999, April 2007, November 2007, December 2008, April 2010, December 2011
Scottish Premier League Manager of the Month: August 2000, December 2000, February 2001, August 2001, April 2002, November 2002, October 2003, November 2003, January 2005
LMA Football League First Division Manager of Year: 1993–94
LMA Football League Third Division Manager of Year: 1995–96
SFWA Manager of the Year: 2000–01, 2001–02, 2003–04
Scottish Premier League Manager of the Year: 2003–04

References

External links

Martin O'Neill BBC Sport, 14 May 2002
Martin O'Neill Flown From The Nest

1952 births
Living people
Sportspeople from County Londonderry
Association footballers from Northern Ireland
Association football midfielders
Lisburn Distillery F.C. players
Nottingham Forest F.C. players
Norwich City F.C. players
Manchester City F.C. players
Notts County F.C. players
Chesterfield F.C. players
Fulham F.C. players
Shamrock Rovers F.C. guest players
NIFL Premiership players
English Football League players
UEFA Champions League winning players
Northern Ireland international footballers
1982 FIFA World Cup players
Football managers from Northern Ireland
Grantham Town F.C. managers
Shepshed Dynamo F.C. managers
Wycombe Wanderers F.C. managers
Norwich City F.C. managers
Leicester City F.C. managers
Celtic F.C. managers
Aston Villa F.C. managers
Sunderland A.F.C. managers
Republic of Ireland national football team managers
Nottingham Forest F.C. managers
Southern Football League managers
Northern Premier League managers
National League (English football) managers
English Football League managers
Premier League managers
Scottish Premier League managers
UEFA Euro 2016 managers
Expatriate football managers from Northern Ireland
Expatriates from Northern Ireland in the Republic of Ireland
Expatriate football managers in the Republic of Ireland
Derry Gaelic footballers
Kilrea Gaelic footballers
Gaelic footballers who switched code
Alumni of Queen's University Belfast
People educated at St Columb's College
People educated at St Malachy's College
Officers of the Order of the British Empire